Dear Aunt Agnes is a Canadian television comedy-drama series that aired on TV Ontario from January 1986 to December 1989. It was filmed in Toronto, Ontario, and ran for three seasons.

Cast

Main Cast
 Heather Conkie - Agnes Peabody
 Mya Rimon - Alex Stefanidis
 Bradley Phillips - Andrew Stefanidis
 Bruce Tubbé - Gary Hutchins

Recurring Characters
 Elias Zarou - Mr. Stefanidis
 Rachael Crawford - Marsha

Plot Background

Teenage Alex and her younger brother Andrew live in Toronto, and are the children of divorced parents.  In the series debut, their mother has just departed on a temporary assignment to the Canadian embassy in Senegal, and her Aunt Agnes arrives to look after the two children in her absence. Also part of the household is a boarder Gary, who studies sociology at the local university.

The series focuses on a variety of challenges young people routinely find themselves dealing with - peer pressure, divorce, single-parent households, and questioning their own & others' values.

Production

Dear Aunt Agnes was created at a time when TV Ontario (TVO) was looking to expand programming for pre-teens. During its research phase, the network discovered a demand for shows that could help young people deal with critical real-life situations in effective ways.  At the time, educators around the province reported the number children from separated families was increasing, and requested programming that might help these young people cope with the anxieties and challenges of living apart from one or both parents.

The Agnes Peabody character had been developed by Heather Conkie in an earlier TVO series It's Mainly Music, and was popular with viewers. In creating the new show, both Conkie and executive producer Ruth Vernon thought this character might have the right mix of oddball fun and wisdom to be both appealing to audiences, and also effective as a guardian and mentor to her two young relatives.  Conkie (who also produced the show, wrote some episodes and composed the theme music) said: "Agnes doesn't have the supreme right to say 'yes' or 'no' to the children, as a parent would.  So they are free to test things out on their own and question adult values".

Although initially aimed at 8-12 year olds, the show also became a hit with parents. By the end of the second season, it was TVO's highest ever rated show in the early evening timeslot. But ratings success was not a priority for the public broadcaster and its primary sponsor: a sharp drop in Ontario government grants in 1987 reduced the network's budgets, and forced the series' cancellation after only two seasons. Viewers flooded the network with calls and letters protesting the decision, with some threatening to withhold their financial support until new episodes were aired. As a network that relied partly on viewer donations, TVO was able to reverse the decision and produced a third season in 1989 after a one year hiatus. The new batch of episodes featured Alex and Andrew facing challenges of teenagers, rather than young adolescents.

Filming was done primarily on a TVO set, with outdoor locations filmed around Toronto's Rosedale, Forest Hill, and Summerhill neighbourhoods, and the University of Toronto campus. The family house shown in the opening credits is located at 121 Crescent Road in Toronto, and was owned at the time by Conkie.

Broadcast
The series ran from January 1986 to December 1989, and episodes were re-run until September 1993. Since then, TVO has not made any episodes available to the public. A very limited number of episodes from other shows were released on TVO's Public Archive streaming site in 2011, but the cost of obtaining rebroadcast rights from actors, writers, and composers has resulted in the archive project focusing more on current events programs than dramas.

Episode guide

References

External links

TVO original programming
Television shows filmed in Toronto
1980s Canadian children's television series